Lithuania competed at the 1992 Summer Paralympics in Barcelona, Spain.

Medalists

See also
Lithuania at the 1992 Summer Olympics

External links
International Paralympic Committee

References

Nations at the 1992 Summer Paralympics
1992
Paralympics